Tor André Johnsen (born 25 November 1968) is a Norwegian politician for the Progress Party. He was elected to the Parliament of Norway from Hedmark in 2013 where he is member of the Standing Committee on Labour and Social Affairs. Johnsen has sat on the municipal council in Ringsaker, Hamar and Stange.

Johnsen considers himself bothered by electromagnetic hypersensitivity.

In 2015, Johnsen was recommended by the Police Security Service to cut off contact with Russian diplomats whom PST considered to be Russian intelligence agents. Johnsen stated that he did not intend to follow the call from PST.

After the parliamentary elections in 2017, Johnsen was reprimanded by the then Prime Minister Erna Solberg for sharing an article from the anti-immigration website 24avisen.com, where a 17-year-old dark-skinned AUF member was incited.

References 

Progress Party (Norway) politicians
Members of the Storting
Hedmark politicians
1968 births
Living people
21st-century Norwegian politicians